Sara Mansour is a Sydney-based lawyer, writer, poet, and founder/artistic director of the Bankstown Poetry Slam. The Bankstown Poetry Slam is the largest regular Poetry Slam in Australia which offers an artistic outlet for the often-marginalised youth of Western Sydney to share their voice in a safe and inclusive environment.

Education 
Mansour graduated in 2016 with a Bachelor of Laws from Western Sydney University.

Career 
Mansour co-founded Bankstown Poetry Slam in 2013 with fellow poet Ahmad Al Rady. Bankstown Poetry Slam holds monthly workshops and Poetry Slam performance evenings which often have more than 300 guests in attendance. Notable poets such as the late Candy Royalle, Rupi Kaur, and Omar Musa have performed at Bankstown Poetry Slam. In 2018, Mansour's team was required to hire security guards for their monthly event after Australian politician Mark Latham incited online racial abuse and death threats towards the Slam-goers.

In 2018, Mansour was one of the nine founding board members of NOW Australia, a not-for-profit national organisation that sought to provide assistance to victims of sexual harassment, intimidation, or abuse in the workplace. NOW Australia was initially led by veteran Australian journalist Tracey Spicer AM and was dissolved in 2020 due to the impact of the COVID-19 pandemic.

In 2019, Mansour co-wrote an episode of Halal Gurls, a six-episode Australian comedy-drama on ABC TV. Halal Gurls is about a group of Muslim women, their careers, and their personal lives in Western Sydney. The show was nominated for an AACTA Award in 2020.

Honours and recognition 

 2017 Canterbury-Bankstown Australia Day Award for Young Citizen of the Year

References

External links
Bankstown Poetry Slam

Living people
Year of birth missing (living people)
Western Sydney University alumni
Lawyers from Sydney
Australian television writers
Australian women television writers
Australian Muslims